The Nobel Prizes are five separate prizes that, according to Alfred Nobel's will of 1895, are awarded to "those who, during the preceding year, have conferred the greatest benefit to Mankind."

This list encompasses laureates of the Nobel Prize who were citizens of the Soviet Union or Russia at the time of receiving the award, or at another time during their life. Of note is that Mikhail Sholokhov is the only citizen of the Soviet Union who received approval from the Soviet government to receive their Nobel Prize. During the Soviet period, all other Nobel Laureates were dissidents or exiles.

Soviet and Russian laureates

Source:

References

 
Russian
Nobel laureates